Rudolf Elmayer von Vestenbrugg (Pula 1881 - Graz 1970), also known als Elmar Brugg, Rudolf Elmar von Vinibert or Elmar Vinibert von Rudolph, was a technical engineer and a prolific Nazi-writer from Austria, who published several popular surveys on the work of cosmologist Hanns Hörbiger and his now-defunct Cosmic Ice (Glacial Cosmogony) Theory, as well as a range of popular antisemitic and National Socialist books, including a biography of the antisemitic politician Georg Ritter von Schönerer.

Up to 1938 Elmayer lived in Graz, where he later returned. During the War he was a SA-lieutenant colonel (Obersturmführer) and a military trainer, stationed in Slovenia. After 1945 he wrote on several other subjects, but he stayed true to his former political beliefs. He published a national-socialist novel and a 1958 dissertation on the Beowulf as a Germanic text.

His last book Eingriffe aus den Kosmos (Interventions from Outer Space) was published posthumously in 1971 by Hans Schindler Bellamy.

References

1881 births
1970 deaths
Atlantis proponents
Catastrophism
Pseudohistorians
Pseudoarchaeology
Religious cosmologies
Science writers
Antisemitism in Austria
Austrian Nazis